Panim is a Papuan language of Papua New Guinea. Panim speakers Mr. Lihot Wagadu and others have been working with linguists from Living Tongues Institute for Endangered Languages to create a Panim Talking Dictionary, hosted at Swarthmore College.

References

External links
 Panim Talking Dictionary

Gum languages
Languages of Madang Province